The Chartered Institute of Fundraising is a registered charity founded in 1983, and is the professional membership body for UK fundraising. The Institute's mission is to support fundraisers through leadership and representation; best practice and compliance; education and networking; and champion and promote fundraising as a career choice.

History 
The CIoF was originally called The Institute of Charity Fundraising Managers, changing its name in 2002 to the Institute of Fundraising to reflect the growing profession.

In 2011, the Institute launched the IoF Academy which offers training and qualifications to fundraisers at every stage in their career. The Certificate in Fundraising, once completed, allows members to use the post nominals MinstF(Cert) and upon completion of the Diploma in Fundraising, members can use the post nominals MinstF(Dip).

On 1 April 2020, the Institute of Fundraising received its Royal Charter from the Privy Council and is now the Chartered Institute of Fundraising.

In 2022, the Chartered Institute became the UK lead organisation for the international Giving Tuesday charity awareness campaign.

References

External links 
 Chartered Institute of Fundraising website

Fundraising
1983 establishments in the United Kingdom
Organizations established in 1983
Business organisations based in London
Charities based in London